Delta Epsilon Iota is a professional Honor Society formed to recognize academic excellence across all disciplines, that began at the University of Georgia in 1994.

Founding
Delta Epsilon Iota was founded in 1994 at the University of Georgia. The founders were Andrew J. Bond, associate director of career planning and placement, and Richard M. Drye, a student. At the time, Drye  was being recruited by the “Big 6″ accounting firms while still an undergraduate. The idea of the Society was a reaction of the increase in this type of recruiting tactic.

History
Delta Epsilon Iota was a member of the Professional Fraternity Association

Membership Requirements
Membership Requirements for Delta Epsilon Iota are:
3.30 GPA on a 4.00 scale *or* scholastic ranking in top 15% of their class
Completed at least 30 semester hours
Enrolled in an accredited college or university and have verification of academic standing

Principles
Principles are Dedication, Enthusiasm and Initiative.

References

Honor societies
Student organizations established in 1994
Former members of Professional Fraternity Association
1994 establishments in Georgia (U.S. state)